Ghosts on the Boardwalk is the eighth studio album from American punk rock band the Bouncing Souls. It was released on Chunksaah Records, the band's own label, on January 12, 2010. This is their first album since The Gold Record (2006), their longest gap to date between studio albums. The album features 12 songs which were originally released as digital singles and 7-inch EPs as part of the 20th Anniversary Series.

Track listing

Personnel
Greg Attonito – vocals
Pete Steinkopf – guitar
Bryan Kienlen – bass
Michael McDermott – drums

References

The Bouncing Souls albums
2010 albums
Chunksaah Records albums